Aholcocerus verbeeki is a moth in the family Cossidae. It is found on Java.

References

"Generic Names and their Type-species". Butterflies and Moths of the World. Natural History Museum. Retrieved April 14, 2016

Cossinae
Moths described in 1957
Moths of Asia